Austin Seibert (born November 15, 1996) is an American football placekicker who is a free agent. He played college football at Oklahoma and was selected in fifth round of the 2019 NFL Draft by the Cleveland Browns.

Early years
Seibert attended and played high school football at Belleville High School-West.

College career
Seibert attended and played college football at Oklahoma. He contributed to the football team as a placekicker and a punter.

Collegiate statistics

Professional career

Cleveland Browns
Seibert was selected by the Cleveland Browns in the fifth round (170th overall) of the 2019 NFL Draft. Seibert signed his rookie contract with the Browns on May 3, 2019.

Seibert made the Browns' 53-man roster out of training camp. He made his NFL debut in the Browns' 2019 regular season opener against the Tennessee Titans. He converted one of two extra point attempts in the 43–13 loss. He scored his first career field goal during the Browns' Week 2 game against the New York Jets, where he kicked three field goals in a Browns' 23–3 win.

Seibert was waived by the Browns on September 14, 2020, after missing a field goal and extra point in a 38–6 loss to the Baltimore Ravens in Week 1.

Cincinnati Bengals
Seibert was claimed off waivers by the Cincinnati Bengals on September 15, 2020. Seibert played in four games during the 2020 season with the Bengals making six of nine field goals and all eight of the extra points he attempted. He was waived on August 31, 2021, after losing out the starting kicker job to Evan McPherson in training camp.

Detroit Lions
On September 1, 2021, the Detroit Lions claimed Seibert off waivers. On September 23, 2021, Seibert was placed on the COVID-19 reserve list. He was replaced on the active roster by kicker Ryan Santoso, who had just been signed to the practice squad. He was placed on injured reserve on November 13 with a hip injury. He was waived by the Lions on October 6, 2022, after the team signed Michael Badgley.

References

External links
Detroit Lions bio
Oklahoma Sooners bio

1996 births
Living people
Players of American football from Illinois
Sportspeople from Belleville, Illinois
American football placekickers
Oklahoma Sooners football players
Cleveland Browns players
Cincinnati Bengals players
American Ninja Warrior contestants
Detroit Lions players